Gabriela Mosca (born 12 August 1969) is an Argentine former professional tennis player.

Biography
Born and raised in San Francisco, Córdoba, Mosca was based in Key Biscayne during her career, moving there at the age of 15. As a junior, she reached as high as second in the ITF rankings.

Mosca competed as a professional player for nine years, with a best singles ranking of 192 in the world. She was a top 100 player in doubles and was featured in the main draw of the women's doubles at the French Open, Wimbledon and the US Open.

She is now living in Buenos Aires and works as a sports-lawyer.

ITF Circuit finals

Singles (1–2)

Doubles (1–5)

References

External links
 
 

1969 births
Living people
Argentine female tennis players
People from San Francisco, Córdoba
Sportspeople from Córdoba Province, Argentina
20th-century Argentine women